Carl Otto Nordensvan (7April 1851 – 30March 1924) was a Swedish general and military writer. He published 24 books dealing with aspects of Swedish military history and related topics. He additionally wrote many articles for the specialist periodical Krigsvetenskapsakademins tidskrift and the general periodical Nordisk familjebok, and was joint editor of Svensk militär tidskrift.

Publications
Handbok för svenska arméns befäl 2 volumes, 1879-1880 (edited with Wilhelm Ernst von Krusenstjerna) )
Öfversigt af Rysslands härorganisation (1879)
Taktiska uppgifter för hemarbete (1884)
En vandring öfver slagfälten i Sachsen (1886)
Värnplikten och inskrifningsväsendet (1887)
Vapenslagens stridssätt (1891)
Kriget och krigsinrättningarna (1893)
Studier öfver Mainfälttåget 1866 (1894)
Fransk-tyska kriget 1870-1871 (1895)
Krigarlif (1896), illustrerad
Finska kriget 1808-1809 (1898)
Nittonde århundradets militära tilldragelser (2 vols., 1899-1900)
Värmlands regementes historia (ledare af arbetet 1903; ny upplaga av del II 1911), illustrated
Svenska armén år 1908 (1906), ett kontroversiellt inlägg i debatten om hur armén borde organiseras efter unionsupplösningen
Krigföringen i dess olika former (1907)
1808. Synpunkter och betraktelser (1908)
Krigsmakten i Sverige 1860-1910 (1911)
Svenska armén sådan den är och sådan den kunde vara (1911)
Utkast till organisation af svenska armén (1912), fortsättning av den föregående, som byggde på Einar af Wirséns Den svenska folkhären
Nordisk familjebok (1913) selected articles
Finlands dödskamp (1913)
Det stora världskriget,  with Valdemar Langlet, (8 volumes, 1914-1919)
Karl XII (1918), on Karl XII
Världskriget 1914-18 (1922) on World War I
August den starke (1923)
På väg till Sveriges stormaktsvälde (1924)

References

1851 births
1924 deaths
Swedish Army major generals
Military personnel from Stockholm
Swedish non-fiction writers
Swedish military historians